Schefflera hullettii is a species of plant in the family Araliaceae. It is endemic to Singapore.

References

Flora of Singapore
hullettii
Least concern plants
Taxonomy articles created by Polbot